Onyx is the third studio album by American rock band Pop Evil.  It was released on May 14, 2013. The first single, "Trenches", was released February 28, 2013.  The album was available for streaming a day before its official release date. It was produced by Johnny K, mixed by Jay Ruston, and mastered by Paul Logus. Additional vocal production was performed by Dave Bassett. Additional programming was done by Bassett and Matt Doughtery.

The album debuted on the Billboard 200 at No. 39, No. 9 on the Independent Albums chart, with 10,000 copies sold in its first week.  It has sold 122,000 copies in the United States as of July 2015.

Track listing

Charts

Album

Singles

Personnel
Leigh Kakaty – lead vocals 
Nick Fuelling – lead and rhythm guitar 
Dave Grahs – rhythm and lead guitar, backing vocals 
Matt DiRito – bass, backing vocals 
Josh Marunde – drums

References

External links
 Pop Evil track listing. underthegunreview.net.

2013 albums
Pop Evil albums
E1 Music albums
Albums produced by Johnny K